Pareiorhaphis parmula is a species of catfish in the family Loricariidae. It is native to South America, where it occurs in the Iguazu River basin in Brazil, with its type locality being given as the Dos Patos River in the state of Paraná. The species reaches at least 9.45 cm (3.7 inches) in standard length and is believed to be a facultative air-breather.

References 

Loricariidae
Fish described in 2005
Catfish of South America
Freshwater fish of Brazil